The Pandharpuri is a breed of water buffalo native to the dry regions of Solapur, Kolhapur, Satara and Sangli in India. The name is derived from the town Pandharpur in Solapur.

The Pandharpuri buffalo has 45-50 centimetre-long horns which are sometimes twisted.

Lactation length is 350 days, calving interval is 465 days. Milk yield is 1400 kg/305 days.

References

Further reading

 M.D. Kulkarni, A.S. Kadam,  A.V. Khanvilkar,  and O.N. Ladukar (June 2005 ). Vein Varicosis in a Pandharpuri Buffalo - A Case Report. Buffalo Bulletin 24 (2): 24
 Project 1: Genetic Characterization of Indigenous Buffaloes Through Mitochondrial DNA and Molecular Markers. DNA Fingerprinting Unit, National Bureau of Animal Genetic Resources, Makrampur, Karnal. Archived 1 December 2008.

Bovines
Fauna of Maharashtra
Water buffalo breeds originating in India
Solapur district
Animal husbandry in Maharashtra